Holly Farm Meadow, Wendling is a  biological Site of Special Scientific Interest west of Dereham in Norfolk, England.

This meadow in the valley of the River Wensum has a line of calcareous springs which supports fen grassland which has diverse flora. The unimproved meadow is maintained by seasonal grazing. There are also areas of tall fen and dry grassland with many anthills.

The site is private land with no public access.

References

Sites of Special Scientific Interest in Norfolk